This is a list of famous and notable people from Goa, India. This list includes Goans and persons of Goan origin who are known to a large number of people, and not based on the extent of their popularity. Neither is the list viewed from the context of the present. Their fame could be brief; what matters is that they were well known during the peak of their popularity. The names are arranged in alphabetical order in their respective categories.

Architects 
 Bruno Souza, Goan-born architect credited with having "belonged to a generation of architects that sought to rediscover what Modern architecture meant for India
 Charles Correa, Goan origin, Indian architect and urban planner. Credited with the creation of modern architecture in post-Independent India, he was celebrated for his sensitivity to the needs of the urban poor and for his use of traditional methods and materials
 Gerard da Cunha, Goan origin, founder and principal architect of the architecture firm Architecture Autonomous. An alumnus of the School of Planning and Architecture, Delhi, he is known for utilizing locally available materials and traditional construction techniques in harmony with its ecosystem

Artists
 Angelo da Fonseca, noted for presenting Christian themes in an Indian style
 Antonio Piedade da Cruz, twentieth-century painter and sculptor
 António Xavier Trindade, important painter of the Bombay School in the early 20th century
 Carl d'Silva, Indian wildlife artist and naturalist well known for his paintings of birds in many ornithological handbooks and field guides.
 Francis Newton Souza (1924–2002), artist
 Frederika Menezes, Goan author, poet and artist. She is best known for her book, Unforgotten (which was a love story for young adults, published in 2014). A poem of hers, The Different Normals, is yet to feature in English textbook of the Goa Board of Secondary & Higher Secondary Education (GBSHSE)
 José Pereira, Sanskrit scholar, historian, writer, artist, and linguist from Goa, India
 Lancelot Ribeiro, Goan origin Modern artist
 Laxman Pai, Indian artist and painter. He was a principal of the Goa College of Art, a post he held from 1977 to 1987. Pai was a recipient of several awards, including India's third highest civilian honour of Padma Bhushan, awarded by the Government of India.
 Mario Miranda (1926–2011), famous for his cartoons in The Illustrated Weekly of India; Padma Vibushan awardee
 Prafulla Dahanukar, Indian painter, a leader in modern Indian art who also helped and influenced many young artists in India.
 Subodh Kerkar, Indian painter, sculptor and installation artist, and founder of the private art gallery Museum of Goa. He is known for his artworks and installations.
 Milroy Goes, film director
 Vamona Navelcar, painter
 Vasudeo S. Gaitonde (1924–2001), regarded as India's foremost abstract artist; received Padma Shri Award in 1971; born in Nagpur of Goan parents
 Kartika Rane, film and television actress
 Kimi Katkar, film actress
 Varsha Usgaonkar, film and television actress

Business people 
 Aisha de Sequeira, Indian banker and co-head of Morgan Stanley
 Cincinnatus Fabian D'Abreo, British Empire india civil servant and businessman
 Francisco D'Souza, American businessman of Goan origin
 Gracias Saldanha, Goan origin founder of Glenmark Pharmaceuticals
 Ivan Menezes, Goan origin, CEO of Diageo
 Manuel António de Sousa, merchant
 Ramnath Kare, industrialist
 Roger Faria, merchant
 Tony Fernandes, Malaysian founder of Tune Air, owner of budget airline Air Asia. Father originally from Goa.
 Vasantrao S. Dempo, industrialist
 Vasudev Salgaocar, Indian businessman, and the founder and chairman of the V. M. Salgaocar Group of Companies, active mainly in iron ore mining, but also in coal mining and wind energy
 Victor Menezes, Goan origin Senior Operating Advisor for New Silk Route

Engineers 
 Manuel Menezes, engineer and former Chairman of the Indian Railway Board
 Peter de Noronha, Goan origin, businessman and civil servant of Kanpur, India. He was knighted by Pope Paul VI in 1965 for his work for the Christian community in India.
 Albert Vivian D'Costa, administrator and architect of the Indian Railways during its inception.

Governors
 Anthony Lancelot Dias, Goan origin, 8th Governor of West Bengal
 Bernardo Peres da Silva, of Neurá; appointed Prefect of Estado da Índia Portuguesa in 1835, the only Goan to hold a post equivalent to a Governor-General
 Rajendra Arlekar, 30th Governor of Bihar and 21st Governor of Himachal Pradesh
 Sunith Francis Rodrigues, 26th Governor of Punjab

Indologists & Archeologists 
Damodar Dharmananda Kosambi (1907–1966), Indologist
Dharmananda Damodar Kosambi (1876–1947), studied Pali; Buddhist scholar
José Gerson da Cunha (1844–1900), historian and Orientalist; wrote the first book on history of Bombay, The Origin of Bombay (1900), published by the Bombay branch of the Royal Asiatic Society
 Prakashchandra Pandurang Shirodkar

Lawyers & Judges
 Anuja Prabhudessai, Judge at Bombay High Court
 Ferdino Rebello, former Chief Justice of Allahabad High Court
 Fitz R S de Souza, Goan origin, barrister-at-law and PhD from London; important figure in African politics; participated in Kenya's struggle for freedom
 Kashinath Trimbak Telang, former Judge at Bombay High Court

Military
 General Sunith Francis Rodrigues, former Chief of the Army Staff and former Governor of Punjab
 Air Chief Marshal Hrushikesh Moolgavkar, Goan-origin Chief of the Air Staff from 1 February 1976 to 31 August 1978
 Lieutenant General WAG Pinto, Senior General officer in the Indian Army and the Victor of Basantar
 Lieutenant General Francis Dias, Senior General officer in the Indian Army who was awarded a Vir Chakra
 Vice Admiral John Colin De Silva, former Vice Chief of the Naval Staff and Director General of the Indian Coast Guard
 Air Vice Marshal Erlic Pinto, Goan origin Air officer in the Indian Air Force
 Filipe Nery Xavier, Portuguese military commander
 Manuel António de Sousa, military captain
 Otelo Saraiva de Carvalho, Goan origin Portuguese military officer
 Kuxttoba, rebel leader from the Rane clan of Sattari
 André Pereira dos Reis, commander who lost Muscat in 1680

Models and Pageants
Anjali Mendes, Goan origin model
Candice Pinto, Goan origin model and pageant
Gail Nicole Da Silva, pageant
Joanne Da Cunha, model
Radha Bartake, pageant
Reita Faria, Goan origin former Miss World
Waluscha De Sousa, Indian actress and model. She made her debut in the 2016 Hindi film Fan.

Musicians & Singers

Anjanibai Malpekar (1883–1974), Hindustani classical singer of Bhendibazaar gharana, Sangeet Natak Akademi Fellowship (1958)
António Fortunato de Figueiredo (1903–1981), conductor, violinist; founder-director of the Academia de Música (now Dept of Western Classical Music, Kala Academy); founder-director of the Orquestra Sinfónica de Goa (Goa Symphony Orchestra)
Anthony Gonsalves (1927–2012), violinist; taught R.D. Burman and Pyarelal Ramprasad Sharma (a member of the Laxmikant Pyarelal team) and worked with most of the legendary composers of the 1950s and 1960s
Chic Chocolate, trumpeter and music composer
Chris Perry, the king of Goan music
Colin D'Cruz, jazz producer and bassplayer; runs Jazz Goa
Datta Naik, Hindi film music director
Dinanath Mangeshkar, dramatist and classical vocalist
Esther Eden, pop singer
Frank Fernand, violinist, trumpeter and music conductor
Hema Sardesai, playback singer
Ian D'Sa, UK-born, of Goan descent; guitarist of Canadian rock band Billy Talent
Jitendra Abhisheki, Indian musician
Kesarbai Kerkar (1892–1977)
Khaprumama Parvatkar (1879–1953), ghumot and tabla player
Kishori Amonkar, classical vocalist
Leoncie, singer
 Lorna Cordeiro, Konkani language singer
Lourdino Barreto, music conductor and composer
Mogubai Kurdikar, classical vocalist
Oliver Sean, singer-songwriter
Prabhakar Karekar, Hindustani classical singer
Prasad Sawkar, singer
Ramdas Kamat, Sangeet Natak musician
 Remo Fernandes, musician and Bollywood playback singer
Sebastian D'Souza, music arranger and conductor
Sonia Sirsat, Fado singer
 Suresh Haldonkar, classical vocalist, actor
 Tsumyoki, Indian rapper, singer, record producer and musician 
Tulsidas Borkar, harmonium player and music composer
Ajit Kadkade, Devotional singer

Olympians

Representing India
 Peter Paul Fernandes was part of India's Gold Medal-winning Men's Field Hockey Team at the 1936 Berlin Olympics.
 Walter D'Souza, Lawrie Fernandes, Maxie Vaz, Leo Pinto and Reginald Rodrigues were part of the Gold Medal-winning Men's Field Hockey Team at the 1948 London Olympics.
 Mary D'Souza Sequeira became the First Indian Woman to Qualify for an Olympics at the 1952 Helsinki Olympics competing in the women's 100 and 200 metres race.
 Lavy Pinto reached the Semi Final of the men's 100 meters Race at the 1952 Helsinki Olympics, the best ever performance by an Indian till date.
 Neville D'Souza from Assagao scored a Hattrick in the Quarter Finals against Australia as the Men's Football Team stood Fourth in the 1956 Melbourne Olympics.
 Fortunato Franco From Colvale was part of the Indian Men's Football team at the 1960 Rome Olympics.
 Anthony Francis Coutinho competes in the men's 4 × 100 metres relay, reaching the semi final at the 1964 Tokyo Olympics
 Stephie D'Souza competes in the Women's 400 meters Race of the 1964 Tokyo Olympics.
 Edward Sequeira from Arpora competes the Men's 5000 meters Race in the 1972 Munich Olympics
Dr Vece Paes was Part of the Men's Hockey Bronze Medal-winning team though He did not play a Match at the 1972 Munich Olympics.
 Mervyn Fernandes was part of the Men's Hockey Team which won the gold medal at the 1980 Moscow Olympics. He also was part of the Team at the 1984 Los Angeles and 1988 Seoul Olympics.
 Margaret Toscano, Selma D'Silva, Lorraine Fernandes and Eliza Nelson were Part of the Women's's Field Hockey Team which stood Fourth at the 1980 Moscow Olympics.
 Joaquim Carvalho from Assolna was part of the Men's Field Hockey team at the 1984 Los Angeles Olympics.
 Darryl D'Souza was Part of the Men's Field Hockey team at the 1992 Barcelona Olympics.
 Leander Paes won a bronze medal in the Men's Singles Tennis at the 1996 Atlanta Olympics.

Representing other nations

 Jack Britto, field hockey, 1952, representing Pakistan
 Seraphino Antao,  Athletics, 1960, 1964, representing Kenya
 Dominic John Rebelo, 1996, 2000 Olympian in archery for Kenya.

Physicians
José Camillo Lisboa, Goan physician and botanist
José Gerson da Cunha, Goan physician who achieved international renown as an orientalist, historian, linguist and numismatist
Acacio Gabriel Viegas, medical practitioner who was credited with the discovery of the outbreak of bubonic plague in Bombay, India, in 1896.
Jaime Valfredo Rangel,  Goan doctor, Director of Tipografia Rangel (Rangel Printing Press), President of the Municipal Council of Bardez (Mayor of Bardez) and a delegate to the International Labour Organization for Portugal.
P. D. Gaitonde, surgeon from Goa and an active participant in the Goa liberation movement. Along with Antonio Colaco, Gaitonde was nominated by the President of India to the 3rd Lok Sabha in 1962, following the incorporation of Goa, Daman and Diu into India on 19 December 1961.
Alvaro de Loyola Furtado, social worker, historian, journalist, medical practitioner and humanitarian. He was described as a leader among men, a man of great integrity and honour.
Bhau Daji, an Indian physician, Sanskrit scholar, and an antiquarian.
Francisco Luís Gomes, Goan physician, writer, historian, economist, political scientist and MP in the Portuguese parliament. A classical liberal by political orientation, Gomes represented Portuguese India in the Cortes Gerais (parliament) from 1861 to 1869.
Rosendo Ribeiro, Goan physician and diplomat.
António Maria de Bettencourt Rodrigues, doctor, Portuguese diplomat and politician.
Vithal Nagesh Shirodkar, Indian obstetrician and gynaecologist, hailing from the State of Goa.
Miguel Caetano Dias, medical doctor best known for his roles as chief of health services in Goa (Estado da Índia Portuguesa) and director of the Medical School of Goa (Escola Médico-Cirúrgica de Goa).
P S Ramani, Indian neurosurgeon and writer from the state of Goa. He is known for his work in Newcastle and his neurospinal surgery technique of "PLIF". He is currently the senior neurospinal surgeon at Lilavati Hospital, Mumbai
Vincent Alvares, medical practitioner and chemist of his Majesty John V of Portugal. In 1713, he accompanied the General of the Arraial of Ponda, Antonio do Amaral Sarmento, to Sunda in Kanara.
M. C. Albuquerque, an Indian physician. She was medical superintendent of the Vanivilas Women and Children Hospital in Bangalore, from 1937 to 1948.
Wilfred de Souza, surgeon and politician from Goa, India. He served as Goa's chief minister on three occasions when he was a member of the Indian National Congress and the Goa Rajiv Congress Party, during his third tenure
Mortó Dessai, a medical analyst of Goan origin who worked in Goa and Portugal
Tomaz Aquino Messias de Bragança physicist and Mozambican social scientist

Politicians

 Abbé Faria, priest, key participant in the Conspiracy Of The Pintos; became a famous hypnotist and revolutionary in France
 Alfredo Bruto da Costa, Minister for Health and Social Welfare of Portugal
 Alfredo Nobre da Costa, Prime Minister of Portugal in 1978
António Costa, Portuguese Prime Minister (since 26 November 2015) and former Mayor of Lisbon (2007–2015)
Cincinnatus Fabian D'Abreo, Saligao origin, Councillor of Karachi Municipality and founder of Karachi Goan Association
 Churchill Alemao, first Catholic Chief Minister and the shortest serving Chief Minister of Goa
Dayanand Bandodkar, first Chief Minister of Goa
Dayanand Narvekar, youngest speaker in Goan assembly history at (34 years) in 1984
 Digambar Kamat, former Chief Minister
Eduardo Faleiro, politician and former central minister
Erasmo de Sequeira, head of United Goans Party; former member of the Indian Parliament at New Delhi
Ernest Soares, Bardez origin, Junior Lord of the Treasury and former Member of Parliament for Barnstaple
 Francisco Sardinha, former Chief Minister and current MP of South Goa
Jack de Sequeira, prominent campaigner for the opinion poll that retained Goa as an separate 'Union territory'
 Jaime Valfredo Rangel, physician and president of the Municipal Council of Bardez, also delegate to the International Labour Organization
 João Leão, Finance Minister of Portugal
John F Fernandez, first Rajya Sabha MP
Jorge Barreto Xavier, Margao born, former Secretary of State of Culture of Portugal
José Inácio Candido de Loyola (1891-1973), Goan independence activist
Joseph Murumbi, Guirim born, 2nd Vice President of Kenya and 2nd Minister for Foreign Affairs (Kenya)
Keith Vaz, Bastora origin, former Member of Parliament for Leicester East
 Laxmikant Parsekar, first incumbent Chief Minister to lose its assembly constituency
Luís de Menezes Bragança, journalist, writer and anti-colonial activist
 Luis Proto Barbosa, former Chief Minister
 Luizinho Faleiro, former Chief Minister and the first unopposed MLA
Manohar Parrikar, former Chief Minister of Goa; former Defense Minister of India
 Narana Coissoró, left his motherland of Goa to serve the Portuguese people and became a member of the Portuguese Parliament
 Nelson de Souza, former Minister of Planning for Portugal
 Otelo Saraiva de Carvalho, formerly a Portuguese military officer, was the chief strategist of the 1974 Carnation Revolution in Lisbon; was born in Lourenço Marques (now Maputo); Mozambique of some Goan ancestry
 Pandurang Purushottam Shirodkar, first speaker of the Goa Assembly
Pio Gama Pinto, Kenyan freedom fighters and politician; director of the Pan African Press
 Pramod Sawant, current Chief Minister
Pratapsingh Raoji Rane, longest serving Chief Minister (15 years and 250 days), longest serving MLA (1972–2022) and oldest speaker in Goan assembly history at (73 years) in 2012
 Ravi Naik, former Chief Minister
Sanyogita Rane, only woman MP
 Shamrao Madkaikar, was a freedom fighter and a leader of Communist Party of India from the Indian state of Goa. Madkaikar established the Gomantakiya Tarun Sangh in 1937 at Margao.
 Shashikala Kakodkar, only woman Chief Minister and the youngest (38) serving Chief Minister
Shripad Naik, longest serving MP from Goa and the current MP of North Goa
Suella Braverman, Assagao origin, Attorney General for England and Wales and Member of Parliament for Fareham
Valerie Vaz, Bastora origin, Member of Parliament for Walsall South
Vinay Tendulkar, current Rajya Sabha MP
 Wilfred de Souza, oldest (71) serving Chief Minister
 Wolfgang Dourado, former Attorney General and Chief Justice of Zanzibar
 Zaneta Mascarenhas, Goan origin, Member of Parliament for Swan

Education
 Armando Menezes, Head of the Department of English St Xavier's College Bombay; Principal of Karnataka College Dharwad; Under-Secretary Education, Government of Maharashtra
 Rui de Figueiredo, professor of Electrical and Computer Engineering and Mathematics, University of California, Irvine

Priests, Nuns, Bishops and Religious leaders 
Ven. Agnelo de Souza, S.F.X - Roman Catholic priest
Aleixo das Neves Dias, S.F.X - Bishop of Port Blair
Angelo Innocent Fernandes - Archbishop of New Delhi
Aniceto Nazareth - Roman Catholic priest in Bombay
Anil Joseph Thomas Couto - current Archbishop of Delhi
Anthony Alwyn Fernandes Barreto - current Bishop of Sindhudurg
Anthony de Mello - Jesuit priest, psychotherapist and author
Anthony Theodore Lobo - Bishop of Rawalpindi/Islamabad, Pakistan (Karachi/Goa)
Antonio Francisco Xavier Alvares - first Metropolitan of Goa and Ceylon of the Malankara Orthodox Syrian Church
Armando Trindade - Archbishop of Lahore
Benny Mario Travas - current Archbishop of Karachi
Blasco Francisco Collaço - first Indian Nuncio
Bridget Sequeira, F.M.C.K. - founded the Franciscan Missionaries of Christ the King, a missionary religious congregation for women in Karachi, Pakistan.
Msgr. Chico Monteiro - Goan priest
Earl K. Fernandes - current Bishop of Columbus
Evarist Pinto - from Aldona, Archbishop of Karachi, Pakistan
Ferdinand Joseph Fonseca - Auxiliary Bishop of Bombay
Filipe Neri Ferrão - from Aldona, current Archbishop of Goa and Daman
Francisco Xavier da Piedade Rebelo - Auxiliary Bishop of Goa
Hubert Olympus Mascarenhas - Catholic priest in Bombay
Ignatius P. Lobo - Bishop of Belgaum
Ivan Dias, Cardinal Prefect, Congregation for the Evangelization of Peoples, Rome (Mumbai/Goa)
Jacome Gonsalves, C.O. - Oratorian priest, also known as the "Father of Catholic Literature of Sri Lanka"
Joseph Cordeiro - first Pakistani Cardinal (Karachi/Goa)
Joseph Coutts - current Cardinal-priest of Pakistan
St. Joseph Vaz - C.O. missionary in Sri Lanka (Ceylon); patron of Roman Catholic Archdiocese of Goa and Daman
Karuna Mary Braganza - Catholic nun and Principal of Sophia College, Bombay
Lumen Monteiro, C.S.C - current Bishop of Agartala
Matheus de Castro (c. 1594–1677) - first Indian Bishop of the Catholic Church
Mathias Fernandes - first native Indian Bishop of Mysore
Max Rodrigues - Bishop of Hyderabad (Pakistan)
Moreno de Souza - translated the Bible into Konkani language
Oswald Gracias - from Carmona, current Cardinal Archbishop of Mumbai
Raul Nicolau Gonçalves - Archbishop of Goa and Damao
Robert D'Silva - Pakistani priest for over 50 years
Romuald D'Souza - Jesuit priest, founder of Xavier Centre of Historical Research and Goa Institute of Management
Msgr. Sebastião Rodolfo Dalgado- Catholic priest, professor and linguist
Thomas de Castro - Vicar Apostolic of Canara
Valerian D'Souza - Bishop of Poona
Valerian Gracias - first Indian Cardinal and Archbishop (Mumbai/Goa)
Vasco do Rego, SJ - Jesuit priest, editor of the oldest Konkani periodical
Zinia Pinto - Catholic nun and principal of St Joseph's Convent School, Karachi

Scientists and Researchers

Froilano de Mello, Portuguese microbiologist, medical scientist, professor, author and independent MP in the Portuguese parliament
 Raghunath Mashelkar, eminent scientist and head of the prestigious Council of Scientific and Industrial Research

Athletes 

 Antao D'Souza, represented Pakistan cricket team in Tests in the 1950s and early 60s
 Anthony de Mello, first secretary of the Board of Control for Cricket in India
 Bhakti Kulkarni, International Master and Woman Grandmaster in Chess
 Brahmanand Sankhwalkar, former Indian football team captain; one of Goa's best goalkeepers; Arjuna awardee
 Brandon Fernandes, all-time top Indian assister in ISL
 Bruno Coutinho, former Indian football team captain, Arjuna awardee and AIFF Player of the Year, 1996
 Carlos Cordeiro, former President of the United States Soccer Federation
 Climax Lawrence, most capped Goan International footballer and AIFF Player of the Year, 2005
 Dilip Sardesai, former Indian international cricketer. He played Tests for the Indian national team as a batsman, the first Goa-born cricketer to play for India, and was often regarded as one of India's best batsmen against spin, although Indian batsmen have been known to play better against spin
 Eliza Nelson, 1982 Asian Games hockey team
 Fortunato Franco, 1962 Asian Games football team
 Ivana Maria Furtado, Woman International Master in Chess
 Lavy Pinto, 1951 Asian Games gold medallist in 100m and 200m sprint
 Lawrie Fernandes, 1948 London Olympics hockey team
 Leander Paes, 1996 Atlanta Olympics Tennis singles bronze medallist, 5 gold medals at the Asian Games (1994-2006) and 18 Grand Slam titles.
 Leo Pinto, 1948 London Olympics hockey team
 Leon Luke Mendonca, Grandmaster in Chess
 Liston Colaco, highest scoring Goan in ISL
 Maria Rebello, former Indian women footballer and currently a referee
 Mandar Rao Dessai, record Appearance maker in ISL
 Margaret Toscano, 1982 Asian Games hockey team
 Mary D'Souza Sequeira, 1954 Asian Games  relay team
 Mauricio Afonso, former Indian football team captain
 Maxie Vaz, 1948 London Olympics hockey team
 Mervyn Fernandis, 1980 Moscow Olympics hockey team
 Peter Paul Fernandes, 1936 Berlin Olympics hockey team
 Pratesh Shirodkar, record Goan Appearance maker in I-league
 Reginald Rodrigues, 1948 London Olympics hockey team
 Rowllin Borges, AIFF Emerging Player of the Year, 2016
 Selma D'Silva, 1982 Asian Games hockey team
 Seraphino Antao, represented Kenya in sprinting in the Common wealth Games during the 1950s and early 60s; won two gold medals
 Shadab Jakati, spin bowler for Goa and Chennai Super Kings; played a key role to help his team win the IPL
 Swapnil Asnodkar, opening batsman for Goa and Rajasthan Royals; played a key role help his team win the inaugural edition of the Indian Premier League
 Stephie D'Souza, 1954 Asian Games  relay team
 Victorino Fernandes, leading Goan goalscorer in I-league
 Wallis Mathias, represented Pakistan cricket team in 1955
 Walter de Sousa, 1948 London Olympics hockey team
 Yeshwant Barde, cricket umpire at the Ranji Trophy and IPL

Tiatrists

Alfred Rose (singer), one of the most popular singers and composers of Konkani songs (of the cantaram category), and is routinely broadcast on the Panaji or Panjim station of All India Radio (Akashvani)
C. Alvares, Indian actor, playwright, singer, producer and director from Saligao, Goa
Comedian Selvy, (1974–2022) playwright, singer, director and producer from Goa. Regarded as one of the greatest Konkani comedians of his generation.
Hortencio Pereira, is a Konkani stage actor from Goa, India. He is a lyricist, writer, actor, comedian, and singer
John D'Silva, is an Indian Konkani actor, playwright and director. D'Silva is the first tiatrist to enter the Limca Book of Records in 2010 for acting, writing, directing and producing 25 tiatrs having a double alphabet in their titles
M. Boyer, is a writer, director and producer from Goa. He has produced over 35 plays, participated in more than 5000 performances, composing and singing over 1000 songs,
Mario Menezes (1960–2022), Indian actor, director, writer and prominent tiatrist. He primarily worked on the Konkani stage and was the vice president of Tiatr Academy Goa
Nevel Gracias (1964–2022), Indian actor, singer, composer, director, playwright, editor and diocesan priest from Goa. He predominantly worked on the Konkani stage and is best known for his lenten tiatrs
Prince Jacob, popular tiatrist and singer from Goa, India. He is "the most Famous man in Konkani Comedy"
Roseferns, Indian actor and director who is a Konkani tiatrist. He popularly goes under the sobriquet King of centuries
Sharon Mazarello, tiatrist, singer, scriptwriter, director and actor, hailing from the coastal state of Goa, India
Tomazinho Cardozo, dramatist, playwright, writer (in Konkani and English), educationist and politician from Goa

Writers, Editors & Journalists

Armand de Souza (1877–1922), founding editor of the Morning Leader in Ceylon; early freedom fighter; jailed by the British colonial government for advocating democracy, but was released following public protests; author of Hundred days in Ceylon under martial law in 1915; father of Senator Doric de Souza (Professor of English) and the late editor of the Times of Ceylon, Tory de Souza
Damodar Mauzo, Jnanpith Award-winning Konkani writer, Novelist, Critic and script writer
B. D. Satoskar, author, ex-editor of Gomantak daily
Chandrakant Keni, retired editor of Marathi daily Rashtramat and Konkani daily Sunaparant; former freelance journalist; was associated with the development of Konkani language; won Sahitya Academy Award for his book Ashadh Pawali
Dom Moraes (1938–2004), won the American Press Club Citation for Excellence in Reporting, for some 20 articles he wrote for the New York Times Sunday Magazine; poet
Francisco Luís Gomes (1829–1869), Portuguese physician, politician, writer, historian, and economist
Frank Simoes, Goan advertising executive; author of Glad Season in Goa
Frank Moraes, editor of prominent newspapers in post-independence India, including The Indian Express
Frederick Noronha, active in cyberspace and involved with e-ventures involving Goa, developmental concerns and free software.
Ian Fyfe (d. 2005), cricketer, coach and a sports journalist from Karachi, Pakistan
Ivo de Figueiredo (born 1966), Norwegian historian, biographer and critic of Goan origin
J. Clement Vaz (1915–unknown) author of Profiles of Eminent Goans, Past and Present
Lambert Mascarenhas, author of the novel Sorrowing Lies My Land (1955); editor of the Goan Tribune; founder editor of Goa Today, former editor of The Navhind Times; won the State Cultural award
Manohar Rai Sardesai, Konkani and French novelist and poet
Maria Aurora Couto, writer, academic and literary critic with books including Graham Greene: On the Frontier, Politics and Religion in the Novels, and Goa: A Daughter's Story
Olivinho Gomes (St Estevam, Goa, 1943—30 July 2009), eminent Konkani scholar and former acting vice chancellor of the Goa
Orlando da Costa (1929–2006), Communist Portuguese poet and writer of Goan descent, born in the capital of the former Portuguese colony of Mozambique, Maputo
Ravindra Kelekar (born 1925), freedom fighter, writer and revivalist of the Konkani language
 Sebastião Rodolfo Dalgado (1855–1922), from Assagão, linguist; knew Malayalam, Sinhala, Bengali, Kannada, Marathi, and Sanskrit; in 1892, he produced a Konkani-Portuguese dictionary and later a grammar
 Teotonio R. de Souza, historian, founder-director of Xavier Centre of Historical Research, Goa (1979–1994); Fellow of the Portuguese Academy of History; author of publications on Goan history and culture

Activists
 Nilesh Naik (1970–1995), Goan environmental activist and farmworker; Goa's first environmental martyr
 Floriano Vaz (1963–1986), Indian writer and activist from Goa. He was the first martyr of the scheduled tribe community who fought for the official status of the Konkani language during the Konkani language agitation.

References

External links
 Goans All Over the World are Doing Great Things
 Great Men of Goa

Goa
 
Konkani people
people
Goan people
People from North Goa district
People from South Goa district
Goan emigrants